Jose Alvarez or José Álvarez may refer to:

Academics
 José Álvarez Junco (born 1942), Spanish historian

Arts and Entertainment
 José Álvarez Cubero (1768–1827), Spanish sculptor in the neoclassical style
 José Álvarez de Toledo, Duke of Alba (1756–1796), patron of painter Goya
 Fray Mocho, pen name of José Ciriaco Alvarez (1858–1903), Argentine writer and journalist
 José María Álvarez de Sotomayor (1880–1947), Spanish playwright and poet
 José Luis Álvarez (artist) (1917–2012), Guatemalan artist
 José María Álvarez (born 1942), Spanish poet and novelist

Business
 José Antonio Álvarez Condarco (1780–1855), Argentine soldier, cartographer and manufacturer of explosives
 José Antonio Alvarez (born 1960), Spanish banker
 José María Álvarez-Pallete (born 1963), Spanish economist and CEO

Politics

Mexico
 José Antonio Álvarez Lima (born 1942), Mexican politician
 José Irene Álvarez Ramos (born 1955), Mexican politician
 José Luis Álvarez Martínez (born 1968), Mexican politician

Spain
 José Álvarez de Toledo y Dubois (1779–1858), Spanish politician and military leader in Texas
 José Joaquín Álvarez de Toledo, 18th Duke of Medina Sidonia (1826–1900), Spanish aristocrat and politician
 José Álvarez de Toledo y Acuña (1838–1898), Spanish politician and diplomant
 José Joaquín Álvarez de Toledo, 19th Duke of Medina Sidonia (1865–1915), Spanish Duke
 Joaquín Álvarez de Toledo, 20th Duke of Medina Sidonia (1894–1955), Spanish Duke
 José Luis Álvarez de Castro (1918–2021), Spanish politician
 José Luis Álvarez (politician) (born 1930), Spanish politician
 José Álvarez de Paz (1935–2021), Spanish politician
 José María Álvarez del Manzano (born 1936), Spanish politician

Elsewhere
 José Francisco Álvarez (1796–1841), Argentine lawyer and politician, Governor of Córdoba
 José Manuel Álvarez (fl. 1901–1904), Argentine politician, Governor of Córdoba
 Jose Alvarez (Filipino politician) (born 1944), Filipino politician

Sports

Association football
 José Álvarez (footballer) (born 1945), Mexican footballer
 José Daniel Álvarez (born 1975), Argentine football midfielder

Baseball
 Joe Alvarez, full name José René Álvarez Ramírez (born 1956), Cuban American baseball manager
 Jose Alvarez (baseball, born 1956), American former Major League Baseball pitcher who played for the Atlanta Braves from 1981 to 1989
 José Álvarez (baseball, born 1989), Venezuelan Major League Baseball pitcher for the San Francisco Giants

Fencing
 José Luis Álvarez (fencer) (born 1969), Spanish fencer
 José Marcelo Álvarez (born 1975), Paraguayan fencer

Sports shooting
 José Álvarez (Virgin Islands sport shooter) (1926–2021), a sports shooter from the United States Virgin Islands
 José Álvarez (Mexican sport shooter) (born 1947), a sports shooter from Mexico

Other sports
 José Álvarez de Bohórquez (1895–1993), Spanish equestrian, Summer Olympics competitor
 José Luis Alvarez del Monte (1931-unknown), Uruguayan chess player
 José Luis Álvarez (rower) (born 1943), Mexican rower
 Jose de Jesus Alvarez (born 1978), a Mexican professional wrestler who wrestles under the ring name Joe Líder